Sir Henry Compton KB (c. 1584 – c. 1649) was an English politician who sat in the House of Commons at various times between 1601 and 1640.

Compton was the son of Henry Compton, 1st Baron Compton of Compton Wynyates, Warwickshire, and his second wife Anne Spencer, daughter of Sir John Spencer of Althorp, Northamptonshire. He matriculated at  Christ Church, Oxford, on 8 June 1599. In 1601, he was elected Member of Parliament for East Grinstead. He was of Lincoln's Inn in 1602, and was knighted to the Order of the Bath in 1603. He was an associate of the bench in 1604. He 

Compton was re-elected MP for East Grinstead in 1604, 1614 and 1621. He was a ranger of Ashdown Forest and a J.P. for Sussx. By 1624 he was Deputy Lieutenant.   He was  re-elected MP for East Grinstead in 1625, 1626 and 1628, sitting until 1629, when King Charles decided to rule without parliament for eleven years. He was custos brevium, court of common pleas in about 1630.

In April 1640 Compton was re-elected MP for East Grinstead in the Short Parliament. He was subject to a fine in the aftermath of the English Civil War.
 
Compton lived at Brambletye, Sussex. He died in or before July 1649, because  on that date the committee for compounding ordered that the balance of his fine should be paid by  the heirs to his estate.

Compton married firstly Cecily Sackville, daughter of Robert Sackville, 2nd Earl of Dorset; Cecily was his stepsister as a result of his mother's remarriage to the earl. They had three sons and three daughters. He married secondly Mary Browne, daughter of Sir George Browne of Battle, Sussex, and had four sons and two daughters.

References

 
 

1580s births
Date of death unknown
Members of Lincoln's Inn
Alumni of Christ Church, Oxford
People from East Grinstead
English MPs 1601
English MPs 1604–1611
English MPs 1614
English MPs 1621–1622
English MPs 1625
English MPs 1626
English MPs 1628–1629
English MPs 1640 (April)
Henry
Younger sons of barons